WBEX (1490 AM) is a radio station broadcasting a News Talk Information format. Licensed to Chillicothe, Ohio, United States, the station is currently owned by iHeartMedia, Inc. and features programming from Fox News Radio, Premiere Radio Networks and Westwood One.

References

External links

BEX
Radio stations established in 1947
1947 establishments in Ohio
IHeartMedia radio stations